Multiplication is an elementary mathematical operation.

Multiplication or multiply may also refer to:

 A generalized multiplicative function, in number theory
 Multiply (website), e-commerce website based in Jakarta, Indonesia
 Multiplication of money, the compounding of central bank funds by commercial lending
 Multiplication (alchemy), an alchemical process
 Product (mathematics), a result of multiplying

Music 
 Multiplication (music), methods of applying multiplication in music
 Multiply Records, a record label
 Multiply (Jamie Lidell album), 2005
 x (Ed Sheeran album), 2014
 X∞Multiplies, a 1980 album by Yellow Magic Orchestra
 "Multiplication" (song), a 1961 song by Bobby Darin
 "Multiply" (ASAP Rocky song), 2014
 "Multiply" (Xzibit song), 2002